Personal Best is a 1982 American drama film written, produced and directed by Robert Towne. It stars Mariel Hemingway and real-life track star Patrice Donnelly, along with Scott Glenn as the coach. The film is about the lesbian relationship between two track-and-field teammates whose relationship might interfere with their performance.

The film was shot in California and Oregon. Several issues arose during production, including a strike by the Screen Actors Guild and a $110 million lawsuit.

The film received positive reviews after its release. Both Gene Siskel and Roger Ebert placed Personal Best on their lists of the ten best films of 1982. It garnered a 73% approval rating at review aggregator Rotten Tomatoes. Despite its popularity with film critics, the film did not succeed at the box office.

Synopsis
Chris Cahill and Tory Skinner are shown as young women who compete in track-and-field. Chris is upset about her difficulty reaching her potential, while Tory is calm. After Chris faints in a bar, Tory drives her home, and they become friends. Tory consoles Chris while she's distressed. After a while, they have sex and fall in love.

Coach Terry Tingloff, who is very upset, says Chris can train on his team, but at first he refuses to teach her. Later, Tory successfully persuades Tingloff to let Chris compete in the trials. The team learns that they will compete for a chance at the 1980 Summer Olympics in Moscow. Tingloff gets enraged because Tory asks to not finish the last two events in a race. She wants to help Chris, who is sick, but Chris wants to perform. Chris criticizes Tingloff for his treatment of Tory.

Tingloff promises Chris a room, board, and tuition for the next year. However, she would have to stay with him during the summer. At first, she accepts the offer, but she changes her mind. The women decide to skip a pentathlon to train at home. Tingloff becomes impressed with Chris's improvement. Chris becomes excited about her higher ranks.

During an argument on their way to practice, Tory and Chris almost break up over how much they worry about each other. While practicing a high jump, Chris dislocates her knee. Tory confesses to moving the mark while showing her how to lengthen her approach in order to lower her center of gravity. This enrages Tingloff.

While she is undergoing treatment for her leg, Tingloff apologizes for his anger and tells her to stay at his house. Tingloff gets enraged because he thinks Tory and Chris' relationship is damaging their performance. He intentionally provokes Chris to get her angry in order to make her hit him. Tingloff keeps Tory and Chris from appearing on the field at the same time. Chris becomes friends with a professional swimmer named Denny and they start a relationship.

At the US Olympic trials, Tory injures her knee, and Chris tells her to keep going if she wants to make the team. Tory, Chris, and another competitor, Pooch Anderson, make the team. However, they will not go to Moscow due to the United States boycott. Tory is happy that Chris is dating Denny. The movie ends with the three teammates on the podium.

Cast

Production
Hemingway trained extensively before the film began shooting.

The production was halted in July 1980 because of a strike by the Screen Actors Guild.

Many of the scenes were filmed in San Luis Obispo County. While the sign on the track said "Cal Poly", which is a university in San Luis Obispo, it was filmed at the track at Morro Bay High School. Two scenes were filmed at restaurants in downtown San Luis Obispo; the Cigar Factory and 1865. Filming also took place in Eugene, Oregon. Locations included Hayward Field and the Track Town Pizza restaurant.

Towne clashed with David Geffen during the production. He later sued Geffen and others for $110 million.

Although Michael Chapman is listed as the director of photography, Reynaldo Villalobos and Caleb Deschanel did uncredited work.

Reception

Critical response
Personal Best garnered a 73% approval rating at review aggregator Rotten Tomatoes based on 33 reviews. Roger Ebert gave the film four out of a possible four stars and wrote, "This is a very physical movie, one of the healthiest and sweatiest celebrations of physical exertion I can remember... It is filled with the uncertainties, risks, cares, and rewards of real life, and it considers its characters' hearts and minds, and sees their sexuality as an expression of their true feelings for each other". Both Gene Siskel and Roger Ebert placed Personal Best on their lists of the ten best films of 1982. Pauline Kael wrote that "There has probably never been a growing-up story presented on the screen so freely and uninhibitedly." Vincent Canby of The New York Times praised the acting of the four leads, but criticized the storyline and the "prettified slow-motion footage."

Box office
Personal Best did well in its initial limited engagement, but ultimately flopped at the box office.

Accolades
The film is recognized by American Film Institute in these lists:
 2008: AFI's 10 Top 10:
 Nominated Sports Film

References

External links

1982 films
American track and field films
American LGBT-related films
1982 LGBT-related films
Lesbian-related films
LGBT-related sports drama films
Films shot in Eugene, Oregon
Films set in Oregon
Films about women's sports
The Geffen Film Company films
Warner Bros. films
Films about the 1980 Summer Olympics
Films about Olympic track and field
Films directed by Robert Towne
Films with screenplays by Robert Towne
Films scored by Jack Nitzsche
1982 directorial debut films
LGBT-related coming-of-age films
1980s English-language films
1980s American films
American sports drama films